Victoria University may refer to:

 Victoria University of Wellington
 University of Victoria, British Columbia, Canada
 Victoria University, Melbourne, Australia
 Victoria University of Bangladesh
 Victoria University, a federated university affiliated with the University of Toronto, in Canada
 Victoria University (United Kingdom), a former federal university in England
 Victoria University, Leeds, a former college of the federal Victoria University (United Kingdom), now the University of Leeds
 Victoria University, Liverpool, a former college of the federal Victoria University (United Kingdom), now the University of Liverpool
 Victoria University of Manchester, a former college of the federal Victoria University (United Kingdom), now merged into the University of Manchester
 Victoria University Uganda
 SC Victoria University, a football team in Uganda

See also 
Victoria College (disambiguation)
 University of Vic - Central University of Catalonia, Spain
 Uvic (disambiguation)
 VU (disambiguation)
 Victoria (disambiguation)